Tunic may refer to :

Tunic, a simple garment type. Sub-types or specific uses include :
Tunic top, commonly known as a T-shirt
Tunic (military),  a type of medium length coat or jacket, worn by military forces
Priestly tunic, an undergarment or shirt worn by the High Priest and priests when they served in the Temple in Jerusalem
Tunic suit, also known as a Mao Suit or Yat-Sen Suit, a type of chinese menswear often associated with mid-late 20th century chinese leaders.

Tunic (video game), an action adventure video game

See also

 
Tunica (disambiguation)
Tunicate
Tunick (surname)